In mathematics, more precisely in group theory and hyperbolic geometry, Arithmetic Kleinian groups are a special class of Kleinian groups constructed using orders in quaternion algebras. They are particular instances of arithmetic groups. An arithmetic hyperbolic three-manifold is the quotient of hyperbolic space  by an arithmetic Kleinian group.

Definition and examples

Quaternion algebras 

A quaternion algebra over a field  is a four-dimensional central simple -algebra.

A quaternion algebra is said to be split over  if it is isomorphic as an -algebra to the algebra of matrices ; a quaternion algebra over an algebraically closed field is always split.

Arithmetic Kleinian groups 

Let  be a quaternion algebra over  such that for any embedding  the algebra  is isomorphic to the Hamilton quaternions.

The discreteness is a rather immediate consequence of the fact that  is only split at its complex embeddings. The finiteness of covolume is harder to prove.

It follows immediately from this definition that arithmetic Kleinian groups are discrete and of finite covolume (this means that they are lattices in ).

Examples 

The groups thus obtained are the Bianchi groups. They are not cocompact, and any arithmetic Kleinian group which is not commensurable to a conjugate of a Bianchi group is cocompact.

Trace field of arithmetic manifolds 

The invariant trace field of a Kleinian group (or, through the monodromy image of the fundamental group, of an hyperbolic manifold) is the field generated by the traces of the squares of its elements. In the case of an arithmetic manifold whose fundamental groups is commensurable with that of a manifold derived from a quaternion algebra over a number field  the invariant trace field equals .

One can in fact characterise arithmetic manifolds through the traces of the elements of their fundamental group. A Kleinian group is an arithmetic group if and only if the following three conditions are realised:
Its invariant trace field  is a number field with exactly one complex place; 
The traces of its elements are algebraic integers; 
For any  in the group,  and any embedding  we have .

Geometry and spectrum of arithmetic hyperbolic three-manifolds

Volume formula 

For the volume an arithmetic three manifold  derived from a maximal order in a quaternion algebra  over a number field  we have the expression:

Finiteness results 

A consequence of the volume formula in the previous paragraph is that

This is in contrast with the fact that hyperbolic Dehn surgery can be used to produce infinitely many non-isometric hyperbolic 3-manifolds with bounded volume. In particular, a corollary is that given a cusped hyperbolic manifold, at most finitely many Dehn surgeries on it can yield an arithmetic hyperbolic manifold.

Remarkable arithmetic hyperbolic three-manifolds 

The Weeks manifold is the hyperbolic three-manifold of smallest volume and the Meyerhoff manifold is the one of next smallest volume.

The complement in the three—sphere of the figure-eight knot is an arithmetic hyperbolic three—manifold and attains the smallest volume among all cusped hyperbolic three-manifolds.

Spectrum and Ramanujan conjectures 

Arithmetic manifolds in three-dimensional topology 

Many of Thurston's conjectures (for example the virtually Haken conjecture), now all known to be true following the work of Ian Agol, were checked first for arithmetic manifolds by using specific methods. In some arithmetic cases the Virtual Haken conjecture is known by general means but it is not known if its solution can be arrived at by purely arithmetic means (for instance, by finding a congruence subgroup with positive first Betti number).

Arithmetic manifolds can be used to give examples of manifolds with large injectivity radius whose first Betti number vanishes.

A remark by William Thurston is that arithmetic manifolds "...often seem to have special beauty." This can be substantiated by results showing that the relation between topology and geometry for these manifolds is much more predictable than in general. For example:
For a given genus g there are at most finitely many arithmetic (congruence) hyperbolic 3–manifolds which fiber over the circle with a fiber of genus g.
There are at most finitely many arithmetic (congruence) hyperbolic 3–manifolds with a given Heegaard genus.

Notes

References

Kleinian groups
3-manifolds
Hyperbolic geometry
Number theory
Riemannian manifolds